Ampay is a  mountain in the Andes of Peru. It is located in the Apurímac Region, Abancay Province, on the border of the districts of Abancay, Huanipaca and Tamburco. The mountain lies in the Ampay National Sanctuary.

An intermittent stream named Q'illu Yakuyuq (Quechua for "the one with yellow water", also spelled Ceelloyacuyoc) originates west of the mountain. It flows to the northwest.

See also 
 Usphaqucha

References

Mountains of Peru
Mountains of Apurímac Region